From 1993 to 2023, Montana was represented in the United States House of Representatives by one at-large congressional district, among the 435 in the United States Congress. The district was the most populous U.S. congressional district, with just over 1 million constituents. It was also the second-largest by land area, after Alaska's at-large congressional district, and the largest by land area in the contiguous United States.

The district was last represented by Republican Matt Rosendale. It had previously been represented by Republican Greg Gianforte, who did not seek re-election in 2020. Instead, he opted to run for Governor of Montana.

Starting in the 2022 midterm elections, per the 2020 United States census, Montana regained the congressional seat it lost after the 1990 census. Thus, the current at-large statewide district was dissolved, and the new districts were the 1st district in the west and the 2nd district in the east. Rosendale sought re-election in the 2nd district.

Politics
President George W. Bush won Montana in the 2004 presidential election with 59.1% of the vote, beating John Kerry by 20 percentage points, which indicates that the district leans Republican. However, four years later John McCain won the state by only 2.5% over Barack Obama, and there is a significant Democratic presence in the state: as of 2021 one U.S. Senate seat is held by a Democrat, which suggested at the time that the district could be competitive in future elections. In 2016, Donald Trump won by over 20%, while Ryan Zinke won Montana's single congressional seat by over 16%. Incumbent Democratic Governor Steve Bullock, however, was also reelected by 4%. The seat was left vacant when Zinke was appointed Secretary of the Interior. In a special election held on May 25, 2017, Republican Greg Gianforte won with a margin of 6% and would be reelected by a margin of 5% in 2018.

Early at-large district
From statehood in 1889, until the creation of geographic districts in 1919, Montana was represented in the United States House of Representatives by members elected at-large, that is, requiring voting by all the state population. From 1913 to 1919, there were two seats, still elected at-large; the top two finishers were awarded the seats. After that time, two representatives were elected from two geographic districts of roughly equal population, from the east and the west of the state. 

In the reapportionment following the 1990 census, Montana lost one of its two seats. Its remaining member was again elected at-large.

Recent voting history
Election results from recent state wide races are shown below.

List of members representing the district

1889–1919: One, then two seats 

The two at-large seats were moved to district representation in 1919, and remained until 1993, when Montana lost a seat due to redistricting from the 1990 US Census, re-establishing the single seat at-large district.

1993–2023: One seat

Recent election results

The following are official results from the general elections.

Notes

References
 2004 Election results for Montana At Large Congressional district

 Congressional Biographical Directory of the United States 1774–present

At-large
At-large United States congressional districts
Constituencies disestablished in 2023
2023 disestablishments in Montana
Former congressional districts of the United States